Fluorotelomers are fluorocarbon-based oligomers, or telomers, synthesized by telomerization. Some fluorotelomers and fluorotelomer-based compounds are a source of environmentally persistent perfluorinated carboxylic acids such as PFOA and PFNA, while others are under extended investigation.

Types
There are many broad categories of fluorotelomers:
 Fluorotelomer alcohols (FTOH)
 Fluorotelomer ethoxylates (FTEO)
 Fluorotelomer fumarates
 Fluorotelomer methacrylates (FTMAC)
 Fluorotelomer sulphonates (FTS)

Manufacture
In the radical telomerization of fluorotelomer molecules, a variety of fluorinated alkenes can serve as unsaturated taxogens including tetrafluoroethylene, vinylidene fluoride, chlorotrifluoroethylene, and hexafluoropropene. However, many fluorotelomers, such as fluorotelomer alcohols, are fluorocarbon-based because they are synthesized from tetrafluoroethylene. In addition to alcohols, synthetic products include fluorotelomer iodides, olefins, and acrylate monomer. Polymerized acrylate from iodide and alcohol monomers represent >80% of the global manufacture and use of fluorotelomer-based products.

Applications
Fluorotelomers are used in fire-fighting foams, grease-resistant food packaging, leather protectants and stain-resistant carpeting, textiles, anti-fogging sprays and wipes. Fluorotelomers are applied to food contact papers for their lipophobicity, making paper resistant to absorbing oil from fatty foods. Fluorotelomer coatings are used in microwave popcorn bags, fast food wrappers, candy wrappers, and pizza box liners.

Environmental and health concerns
Fluorotelomers that contain PFOA precursors can be metabolized into, and degrade to, PFOA, a persistent global contaminant found in people in the low-parts per billion range. Toxicologists estimate microwave popcorn, because of the high heat and coated bag, could account for about 20% of the PFOA levels measured in an individual consuming 10 bags a year if 1% of the fluorotelomers are metabolized to PFOA.

PFOA is also formed as an unintended byproduct in the production of fluorotelomers, and is thus present in finished goods treated with fluorotelomers, including those intended for food contact. In a U.S. Food and Drug Administration (USFDA) study, fluorotelomer-based paper coatings (which can be applied to food contact paper in the concentration range of 0.4%) were found to contain 88,000–160,000 parts per billion PFOA, while microwave popcorn bags contained 6–290 parts per billion PFOA.

Industry and government actions
In 2002 Burger King stopped using fluorotelomer coated boxes.

After more than a year of negotiating with "telomer makers Asahi Glass, Clariant, Daikin America, and DuPont to perform degradation studies on 13 of their products", the U.S. Environmental Protection Agency (USEPA) and companies were not able to agree on terms. Thus, in late June 2004 the USEPA announced it would perform the degradation studies itself, with an expected time to complete the studies of 1 year. However, in a December 2005 deal with the USEPA over alleged withholdings, DuPont agreed to test nine of its fluorotelomer-based products' potential to break down into PFOA by 27 December 2008. Yet, in late December 2008, the USEPA and DuPont filed a joint motion stating that DuPont needed additional time to purify the products. USEPA lawyers extended the deadline by three years, to 27 December 2011, in the last month of the Bush Administration.

In 2009 a 546-day USEPA study was published that estimated a degradation half-life for a fluorotelomer-based polymer in the range of 10–17 years. This estimate was much shorter than the half-life estimated by a DuPont study.   Given this discrepancy, the USEPA undertook an extensive effort to develop methods for testing the degradation rate of commercial fluorotelomer-based polymers.  The USEPA then carried out studies with two DuPont polymers in four soils and water using these methods.  These new studies reported half-life ranges for these commercial fluorotelomer-based polymers of 33 to 112 years, roughly consistent with EPA's 2009 estimate.

References

External links
Perfluorooctanoic Acid (PFOA); Fluorinated Telomers enforceable consent agreement development

Organofluorides
Oligomers